Robert Hewitt Barker (1887 – 14 February 1961) was a British textile mill owner. He was the independent Member of Parliament for Sowerby, 1918–1922, with the support of the National Association of Discharged Sailors and Soldiers.

He became joint owner of the firm of Luke Barker and Sons, cotton spinners in Todmorden. He was in the Lancashire Fusiliers in World War I, rising to the rank of Major. He stood for Parliament in 1918, but did not stand again in 1922.

References

External links
http://www.theyworkforyou.com/mp/robert_barker/sowerby

UK MPs 1918–1922
Members of the Parliament of the United Kingdom for English constituencies
People from Todmorden
1887 births
1961 deaths
Independent members of the House of Commons of the United Kingdom
British Army personnel of World War I
Lancashire Fusiliers officers